Palaeugoa is a genus of moths in the family Erebidae. It contains only one species, Palaeugoa spurrelli, which is found in Ghana and Kenya.

References

Nudariina
Moths of Africa
Monotypic moth genera
Moths described in 1914